Alex de Minaur and Blake Ellis were the defending champions, but both players chose not to participate.

Hsu Yu-hsiou and Zhao Lingxi won the title, defeating Finn Reynolds and Duarte Vale in the final, 6–7(8–10), 6–4, [10–5].

Seeds

Draw

Finals

Top half

Bottom half

References 

Draw 

Boys' Doubles
2017